The 1993–94 Alabama Crimson Tide men's basketball team represented the University of Alabama in the 1992-93 NCAA Division I men's basketball season. The team's head coach was David Hobbs, who was in his second season at Alabama.  The team played their home games at Coleman Coliseum in Tuscaloosa, Alabama. They finished the season with a record of 20–10, with a conference record of 12–4, good enough for second place in the SEC Western Division.

Senior guard James "Hollywood" Robinson and junior forward Jason Caffey were joined by Jamal Faulkner, a junior transfer from Arizona State.  Key freshman signees were forward-center Antonio McDyess and guard Eric Washington.

The Tide reached the semifinal of the 1994 SEC men's basketball tournament final, but lost to Florida.  The Tide earned an at-large bid to the 1994 NCAA tournament, defeating Providence in the first round and losing to Purdue.

Roster

References 

Alabama Crimson Tide men's basketball seasons
Alabama
Alabama
1993 in sports in Alabama
1994 in sports in Alabama